Cleinias (Kleinias) may refer to a number of people from ancient Greek history:

Members of the Alcmaeonidae family
Cleinias, father of the Athenian statesman and general Alcibiades
Cleinias, brother of Alcibiades, younger brother of the famous general
Cleinias, son of Axiochus; he is introduced as a very young man by Plato in the dialogue called Euthydemus
Cleinias of Tarentum, Pythagorean philosopher
Cleinias of Croton, tyrant of Croton c. 495 BC
Cleinias of Sicyon, magistrate of Sicyon c. 270-264 BC, father of Aratus of Sicyon.
Cleinias of Crete, a cretan lawgiver who appears in Plato's Laws.